Phyllis Annetta Frelich (February 29, 1944 – April 10, 2014) was a Tony Award-winning deaf American actress. She was the first deaf actor or actress to win a Tony Award.

Early life
Frelich was born to deaf parents Esther (née Dockter) and Philip Frelich, and was the eldest of nine siblings (all deaf). She attended North Dakota School for the Deaf, graduating in 1962, and then went on to study at Gallaudet College, the only liberal arts university in the world for deaf students. Her parents were also alumni of the North Dakota School for the Deaf. At Gallaudet she completed a degree in library science, but also participated in theater. It was there that she was seen performing by David Hays, one of the founders of the National Theater of the Deaf, who asked her to join the theater company.

Career
In 1973, she moved to New York City along with Mel Winkler, Frank Alesia, and Jeannie Russell. 

Frelich originated the leading female role in the Broadway production of Children of a Lesser God, written by Mark Medoff. That play was specially written for her, and based to some extent on her relationship with her husband Robert Steinberg. Children won the Tony for Best Play; Frelich won the 1980 Best Actress Tony Award and her co-star, John Rubinstein, won the Best Actor Tony Award. Frelich was the first deaf actor or actress to win a Tony Award. Marlee Matlin played Frelich's role in the film version, for which she won the Academy Award for Best Actress. Frelich later starred in other plays written by Medoff, including The Hands of Its Enemy and Prymate. She was nominated for an Emmy Award for her performance in the 1985 television movie Love Is Never Silent. On the original air date of February 9, 1985, she appeared as a guest in the Gimme A Break! episode "The Earthquake". Frelich appeared in the recurring role of Sister Sarah on Santa Barbara. Her last acting role was in an episode of CSI: Crime Scene Investigation in 2011.

Frelich was elected to the ninety-member Screen Actors Guild (SAG) Board in Hollywood, the highest policy-making body in the entertainment industry in 1991. She was the first deaf actress to be recognized in the United States.

In 1991, Frelich starred with Patrick Graybill in The Gin Game at the Deaf West Theatre in Los Angeles drawing critical acclaim on their aesthetic art of American Sign Language. This performance was adapted from D. L. Coburn's play and was directed by Linda Bove, with Deaf West Theatre artistic director Ed Waterstreet.

Death
Frelich died on April 10, 2014, at her home in Temple City, California at the age of 70 in April 2014 from progressive supranuclear palsy (PSP), a rare degenerative neurological disease for which there are no treatments.

News of her death broke on the Deaf West Theater Facebook page. The post honored Frelich for "paving so many roads for (the Deaf Community). A leading light of our community has been lost, and we mourn deeply. Our thoughts are with her family."

Filmography

Film

Television

References

Further reading

External links

 
 

1944 births
2014 deaths
People from Devils Lake, North Dakota
20th-century American actresses
21st-century American actresses
Actresses from North Dakota
American deaf actresses
American film actresses
American stage actresses
American television actresses
Tony Award winners
People from Temple City, California
American deaf people